Khabat District, also spelt Kabat, or Qezayê Xabat in Kurdish, is a district in the west of Erbil Governorate in Iraq. It has three sub-districts, Rizgary, Kewrgosk and Darashekran, and 64 villages. The district lies 37 km west of the city of Erbil, on the main road between Erbil and Mosul.

References

Districts of Erbil Governorate
Erbil Governorate